Serge Weinberg (born 10 February 1951) is a French businessman, and the founder and chairman of Weinberg Capital Partners, an investment firm.

Early life and education
Weinberg trained as a civil servant, after graduating with a bachelor's degree in Law from the University of Paris and from the Institut d'Etudes Politiques de Paris. He studied at the École nationale d'administration, the French School for Civil Service.

Career

Career in the public sector
Weinberg started his career as a civil servant in the French administration (1976–81), before becoming « Chef de cabinet » (private principal secretary) to the Budget Minister (Laurent Fabius, 1981–82).

Career in the private sector
Weinberg later held several management positions at FR3 and Havas. In 1990, after three years as General Manager with investment bank Pallas Groupe, he joined the Pinault Group as CEO of CFAO. Next, he was appointed CEO of Rexel (1991–95). From 1995 to 2005, he was chairman of the management board of PPR, the largest non-food retailer in Europe and the third largest multi-brand luxury goods company in the world.

He is the chairman of Sanofi, a French pharmaceutical firm, known for its prescription products such as Lantus insulin.

Other activities

Corporate boards
 Accor, Non-Executive Chairman of the Board
 Schneider Electric, Member of the Board of Directors 
 Fnac, Member of the Board of Directors  
 Artémis, Member of the Board of Directors 
 Gucci, Member of the Board of Directors

Non-profit organizations
 Club of Three, Member of the Steering Group
 Paris Europlace, Member of the Board of Directors
 Sanofi Espoir Foundation, Member of the Board of Directors

At least between 1998 and 2008 Weinberg was a member of the Trilateral Commission.

References

External links 
 Weinberg Capital Partners
 Accor Group

1951 births
Living people
Kering people
Sciences Po alumni
École nationale d'administration alumni
Businesspeople from Paris
Sanofi people
People from Boulogne-Billancourt